Mpu Panuluh was a Javanese literary poet who lived during the Jayabaya reign of the Kadiri Kingdom in Java, Indonesia. He is especially well known for completing writing of Kakawin Bhāratayuddha which was pioneered by his brother, Mpu Sedah. Mpu Panuluh also wrote Kakawin Hariwangsa and Gatotkacasraya.

References 

Javanese people
Kediri Kingdom
Indonesian male poets
Year of birth unknown
Place of birth unknown
Year of death unknown
Place of death unknown
12th-century Indonesian people
Hindu writers
Indonesian Hindus